Still Life with a Peacock is a 1714 oil on canvas painting by Alexandre-François Desportes, now in the Musée des Beaux-Arts de Lyon.

Sources
http://www.mba-lyon.fr/mba/sections/fr/collections-musee/peintures/oeuvres-peintures/xviiie_siecle/desportes_nature_mor

1714 paintings
French paintings
Paintings in the collection of the Museum of Fine Arts of Lyon
Birds in art
Still life paintings
Monkeys in art